Gore Hill is an urban locality on the Lower North Shore of  Sydney, New South Wales, Australia. Gore Hill is located within the southern part of the suburb of Artarmon, and the north-west of the suburb of St Leonards.

History 

It is best known for being where the Gore Hill Freeway from Lane Cove to the Sydney Harbour Bridge starts and ends and as the location of the ABC's Sydney television transmission tower, which is 170 m (558 ft) high. For more than 40 years Gore Hill was probably best known as the location of the ABC's Sydney television studios which were established in 1956 and which operated until June 2003, when the site was closed and sold, and the ABC moved its television operations to its combined TV-radio studio facility in the inner-city suburb of Ultimo.

Heritage listings
Gore Hill has a number of heritage-listed sites, including:
 Pacific Highway: Gore Hill Cemetery

Media 
Fox Sports occupy their new headquarters at Gore Hill, operational since late 2012.

Foxtel occupy their new headquarters at Gore Hill, operational since mid 2017.

ATN Channel 7 also had a transmission mast at Gore Hill but this was demolished in the early 1970s. Gore Hill is also home to Royal North Shore Hospital, historic Gore Hill cemetery, and Gore Hill Oval, home of the North Shore Bombers Australian Rules Football club.

Brick and tile works 

Bricks were first made at Gore Hill in 1828 and continued until 1954. A siding was constructed from the North Shore Railway to a brickworks operated by the North Sydney Brick and Tile Company in 1902. Horses hauled open 4-wheel goods wagons over the line. Soon after 1910, the line was extended through a tunnel under Reserve Road. Though blocked from public access, this tunnel remains and forms part of Austcorp's Winevault complex.

References 

 
Sydney localities
City of Willoughby
Lane Cove Council